The United States Virgin Islands competed at the 2010 Summer Youth Olympics in Singapore.

Medalists

Athletics

Boys
Track and Road Events

Basketball

Boys

Sailing

One Person Dinghy

Swimming

References

External links
 Competitors List: Virgin Island

Nations at the 2010 Summer Youth Olympics
2010 in United States Virgin Islands sports
Virgin Islands at the Youth Olympics